Gangapur is a village near Buchiana mandi in Jaranwala Tehsil in Faisalabad District, Punjab, Pakistan. It is located at 31°27'12N 73°33'57E with an altitude of 193 metres (636 feet) and is part of Union council 39 of Jaranwala with a population of 10,988. The village is home to an operational  narrow gauge horse-drawn tramway originally built in 1898 to connect with the Buchiana railway station  to the south Ghangha Pur .

References

Heritage streetcar systems
Horse-drawn railways
Horse-drawn trams in operation
Villages in Faisalabad District